Mahmoud Tarha (born 1 April 1962) is a Lebanese weightlifter. He competed in the men's flyweight event at the 1984 Summer Olympics.

References

1962 births
Living people
Lebanese male weightlifters
Olympic weightlifters of Lebanon
Weightlifters at the 1984 Summer Olympics
Place of birth missing (living people)
20th-century Lebanese people